The Tatra 92 was an army off-road truck model made by Czech manufacturer Tatra between 1937 and 1941. It was mainly used for transporting military cargo and personnel in Czech and later German armies, but also ambulance and field kitchen lorry versions were made. The significant part of the production batch was exported to Kingdom of Romania.

The vehicle had an air-cooled OHC V8 engine with 3981 cc rated to  power at 2500 rpm. The fuel consumption was up to 35 liters per 100 km. The car had 3 axles, of which both back axles were driven.  It had 4 gears and 1 reverse gear. The truck chassis, based on the Tatra backbone chassis conception, has  empty weight. While the truck was rated for  payload. The Tatra 92 was capable of traveling at  speed.

In 1939, 80 cars of the Tatra 93 version with all three axles driven (6x6) were also produced exclusively for the Kingdom of Romania's Army. Tatra 93 was built as a high capacity staff car with removable roof. In total, 200 Tatra 93 trucks were acquired by the Romanian Army.

References

External links
Reconstructed Tatra 92 photo gallery
Tatra illustrated production history
Tatra 93 photo gallery

92
Cars of the Czech Republic
Military trucks of Czechoslovakia